For information on all Rider University sports, see Rider Broncs

The Rider Broncs men's basketball team is the basketball team that represents Rider University in Lawrenceville, New Jersey, United States. The school's team currently competes in the Metro Atlantic Athletic Conference.

NBA Players

Postseason results
Rider has appeared in postseason tournaments on ten occasions through the program's history. They have also qualified for three NCAA Division I Tournaments with a combined record of 0–3. The Broncs were 2–1 in their sole appearance in an NCAA Division II tournament. They have appeared in two National Invitation Tournament with a record of 0–2. In two College Basketball Invitationals they are 0–2. They have appeared in three CollegeInsider.com Tournaments with a record of 1–3.

NCAA Division I Tournament results

NCAA Division II Tournament results

NIT results

CBI results

CIT results

Retired numbers

References

External links